is a railway station on the Keisei Chiba Line operated by the private railway operator Keisei Electric Railway in Kemigawacho, Hanamigawa Ward, Chiba City, Chiba Prefecture, Japan.

Lines
Kemigawa Station is served by the Keisei Chiba Line, and lies 5.3 kilometers from the terminus of the line at Keisei-Tsudanuma Station.

Layout
Kemigawa Station has two opposed side platforms connected by a level crossing.

Platforms

History
Kemigawa Station opened on July 17, 1921.

Station numbering was introduced to all Keisei Line stations on 17 July 2010; Kemigawa Station was assigned station number KS54.

See also
 List of railway stations in Japan

References

External links

 Keisei Station layout 

Railway stations in Japan opened in 1921
Railway stations in Chiba Prefecture